The Chamber of Labour (German: Kammer für Arbeiter und Angestellte, shortform Arbeiterkammer or AK), is an organisation that represents the interests of 3 million Austrian employees and consumers. Membership is compulsory for all employees working in Austria, and it is thus not to be confused with Austrian labour unions, where membership is voluntary and which are organized in an umbrella organisation, the ÖGB. Together, the ÖGB and the Arbeiterkammer represent the interests of employees in the Austrian system of Sozialpartnerschaft ("Social Partnership"), which plays a major role in the regulation of wages and prices.
The Austrian Chamber of Labour is based on the nine Chambers of labour for each federal state in Austria. The president of the Chamber of Labour for Vienna is also the president of the Austrian Chamber of Labour.

The Chamber of Labour was founded in 1920 after the collapse of the Austrian-Hungarian monarchy. During 1934 and 1938 the Chamber of Labour were integrated into the fascist unitary trade union centres. In 1938 they were liquidated by the National Socialists.

One of the main projects of the Chamber of Labour is the creation of the work climate index (Arbeitsklima Index), which was established in 1997 and till today (2010) includes about 42,000 interviews of workers in Austria.

References

External links 
 Chamber of Labour

Labor in Austria
Workers' rights organizations
Consumer rights organizations
Political organisations based in Austria
Trade unions established in 1920